América is a Brazilian telenovela that aired on TV Globo from 14 March 2005 to 4 November 2005. It is written by Glória Perez and directed by Jayme Monjardim and Marcos Schechtman. The telenovela focused on the life of an illegal immigrant to the United States and the lives of those she left behind in Brazil. It stars Deborah Secco and Murilo Benício.

In the United States, Telemundo aired a Spanish-dubbed version of América in 2009.

Plot

Main plot
Sol and Tião are born to different social backgrounds—she to a poor suburban family in Rio, and him to an even poorer family who raised cattle in West São Paulo State. They eventually meet, due to unlikely circumstances, but part again, as she has set as her ultimate priority to reach the United States or bust. While she comes to the U.S. to live as an illegal immigrant, he remains in Brazil and, despite many trials and tribulations, he becomes a successful rodeo cowboy.

Subplots
América has several secondary plots about a variety of compelling characters.  These, for the most part, take place in four locales: Vila Isabel, a middle-class neighborhood in Rio de Janeiro; Boiadeiros, a fictional town in West São Paulo State; the home of a rich family in Rio; and Miami. Various characters from each subplots often meet each other due to character linkages within the story.

The main subplots were:
 A love triangle involving Feitosa, a man who worked with pets, his girlfriend Islene (who happened to have a blind daughter from a previous relationship) and Creusa (a virginal woman who turned out to be too lustful).
 The problems and achievements of a blind man, Jatobá, trying to live with his disability in a country with no infrastructure for the visually impaired. He is engaged to a non-blind woman.
 The mischievous Alex and Djanira, smugglers and "coyotes".
 The love life of Glauco, a 50-year-old businessman married to a kleptomaniac woman that strives for a divorce in order to marry her lover (but he later leaves both for a 19-year-old girl).
 The complicated relationship between a middle-class American professor, Edward Talbot, and his rich girlfriend, May, who does social work at a ghetto school in Miami. Due to fan demand, the author of the soap opera changed its ending so Edward ends up marrying the main character, Sol.
 The lives of several illegal immigrants living in a boarding house in Miami kept by a Mexican woman, with Brazilian roots, named Consuelo.
 The thriving Brazil rodeo culture. Rodeo is a traditional sport in many countries in the Americas, with influences from the history of Mexican and Brazilian  vaqueros or vaqueiros (cowboys) and American cowboys.

Cast

Reception

Ratings

Music
Unlike most Brazilian soap operas, América featured different styles of music for each milieu. Vila Isabel had only traditional samba, other parts of Rio de Janeiro included Brazilian pop and funk, São Paulo was scored with Brazilian country music and Miami, with a mix of American pop and Latin music.

The songs used in América are:

Disco 1

01. "Soy Loco por Ti América" - Ivete Sangalo

02. "Até Pensei" - Nana Caymmi

03. "A Volta" - Roberto Carlos

04. "Pra Rua Me Levar" - Ana Carolina

05. "Feitiço da Vila" - Martinho da Vila

06. "Nervos de Aço" - Leonardo

07. "Mágoa de Boiadeiro" - Lourenço & Lourival

08. "Os Amantes" - Daniel

09. "Girassóis Azuis II" - George Israel

10. "Vida de Viajante" - Lenine

11. "She's a Carioca (Ela é Carioca)" - Celso Fonseca

12. "Você" - Marina Elali

13. "Um Matuto em New York" - Roberto Trevisan

14. "Sinfonia dos Sonhos" - Marcus Viana

15. "Órfãos do Paraíso" - Milton Nascimento

16. "Eu Sei que Vou te Amar" - Caetano Veloso

Disco 2

1. "Regresa a mi" - Il Divo

2. "Don't" - Shania Twain

3. "Home" - Michael Bublé

4. "Abrazame Así" - Tamara

5. "Amore e Música" - Russell Watson

6. "The Look of Love" - Diana Krall

7. "Summertime" - Michael Bolton

8. "A Horse with no Name" - America

9. "Redneck Woman" - Gretchen Wilson

10. "Pieces of Me" - Ashlee Simpson

11. "Por un Beso" - Gloria Estefan

12. "Cancion Mixteca" - Mariachi Vargas de Tecalitlan

13. "Besame Mucho" - Maysa

14. "Wind Shaking the Trees" - Darwing James Band

15. "Long Long Away" - Jesse Johnson

17. "Can't Get Over" - Kasino

18. "Breath" - O2

19. "Little Girl" - Lucas Babin

20. "Take Me Home, Country Roads" - Happening

Controversy

Gay kiss deleted scene
While being cited as a pop culture phenomenon previously, the soap opera received greater exposure in the media after a long-running (2005) storyline between two gay characters included a scene in which they share a kiss. The scene was scheduled to be air in the final episode, which created much anticipation from the gay community in Brazil. However, Rede Globo, the soap opera's production company, elected not to run the scene, much to the surprise of the writers, fans and actors involved. The event led to a number of protests for equal rights, condemning Globo for their actions.

Criticism of the positive portrayal of rodeo
Brazilian animal rights organizations criticized the telenovela because rodeo was favorably exposed in the story. Several non-large-scale protests happened in several cities and activists tried to exhort a nationwide boycott campaign against the series. Coincidentally, the series faced a decline of its audience, though that was not attributed to a boycott eventually.

References

External links 
 Sitio de América
 Blog de Telenovelas Brasileiras
 Video Blog de la novela América en español
 Telenovela-World Bi-lingual Forum

2005 telenovelas
2005 Brazilian television series debuts
2005 Brazilian television series endings
Brazilian telenovelas
TV Globo telenovelas
Television shows set in Rio de Janeiro (city)
Television shows set in Miami
Brazilian LGBT-related television shows
Works about illegal immigration to the United States
Telenovelas by Glória Perez
Gay-related television shows
Portuguese-language telenovelas